Mount Ruegg is the culminating peak (1,870 m) on the divide between DeAngelo Glacier and Moubray Glacier in the Admiralty Mountains, Victoria Land. Named by the New Zealand Antarctic Place-Names Committee (NZ-APC) for Captain H. Ruegg, nautical advisor to the Marine Department of New Zealand, a visitor to the Ross Sea area in 1956.

Mountains of Victoria Land
Borchgrevink Coast